is a Japanese association football player currently playing for Yokohama F. Marinos and the Japan national team. His father, Takashi, was also a professional footballer.

National team career
In August 2007, Mizunuma was elected Japan U-17 national team for 2007 U-17 World Cup. He served as captain and played all 3 matches as right midfielder.

Club statistics
.

1includes Japanese Super Cup appearances.

Reserves performance

Last Updated: 25 February 2019

Honours

Club
Yokohama F.Marinos
J1 League : 2022

Cerezo Osaka
J.League Cup : 2017
Emperor's Cup : 2017

Japan
Japan U-23
Asian Games : 2010
Japan U-17
AFC U-17 Championship : 2006

Individual
J.League Best XI: 2022

References

External links

 
 Profile at Cerezo Osaka

1990 births
Living people
Association football people from Kanagawa Prefecture
Japanese footballers
Japan youth international footballers
J1 League players
J2 League players
J3 League players
Yokohama F. Marinos players
Tochigi SC players
Sagan Tosu players
FC Tokyo players
FC Tokyo U-23 players
Cerezo Osaka players
Asian Games medalists in football
Footballers at the 2010 Asian Games
Asian Games gold medalists for Japan
Association football midfielders
Medalists at the 2010 Asian Games